2012 Thai League Division 1 (known as Yamaha League 1 for sponsorship reasons) is the 15th season of the League since its establishment in 1997. It is the feeder league for the Thai Premier League. A total of 18 teams will compete in the league this season.

Changes from last season

Team changes

From Division 1
Promoted to 2012 Thai Premier League
 BBCU
 Buriram (later renamed  Wuachon United and re-located from Buriram Province to Songkhla Province)
 Chainat

Relegated to Regional League Division 2
 Chiangmai
 RBAC Mittraphap
 Samut Prakan Customs United
 Thai Honda

To Division 1
Relegated from Thai Premier League
 Khonkaen
 Siam Navy
 Sriracha
Promoted from Regional League Division 2
 Krabi
 Nakhon Ratchasima
 Phattalung
 Ratchaburi

Teams

Stadia and locations

Foreign players

League table

Results

Season statistics

Top scorers

Top assists

Attendances

See also
 2012 Thai Premier League
 2012 Regional League Division 2
 2012 Thai FA Cup
 2012 Kor Royal Cup

References

2012
2